XXXTENTACION Presents: Members Only, Vol. 4 is the only studio album by American hip hop collective Members Only, led and presented by XXXTentacion. It was released on what would have been XXXTentacion's 21st birthday, January 23, 2019, via Empire Distribution. The album is the only Members Only project to be released since XXXTentacion's death on June 18, 2018.

Promotion and release
The album was released on January 23, 2019, what would have been XXXTentacion's 21st birthday. On the day of the album's release, Members Only embarked on a 22-date tour from January to March 2019, co-headed by Kid Trunks and Craig Xen and featuring other members Cooliecut, Tankhead666, Ratchet Roach, Bass Santana, Flyboy Tarantino, Rawhool, SB, ReddzMoney, and DJ Slicid.

On February 15, an animated music video for "Sauce!", performed by XXXTentacion, was released. The video was animated and directed by Tristan Zammit.
The song "Sauce!" was certified gold by the RIAA for the United States on June 28, 2019.

Commercial performance
In the United States, Members Only, Vol. 4 debuted at number 23 on the US Billboard 200 chart, earning 16,000 album-equivalent units, with 2,000 coming from pure album sales in its first week. The album peaked at 18 on the US Billboard 200 chart.

Track listing

Notes
 "Sauce!" by XXXTentacion is a remix of his 2018 remix of "Ice Tray" by Quality Control, Quavo and Lil Yachty, which shares the same name as this remix but is stylized as "$aUcE!".
 "Touch Eem Body" samples "Ocean Eyes" by Billie Eilish.
 "Over the Rainbow" samples "I've Been Over the Rainbow" by Mort Garson.
 "Empty" samples "Hexagram" by Orlogin.
 "Rebirth (2016)" samples a 2016 Periscope livestream by XXXTentacion.

Charts

References

2019 debut albums
Members Only (hip hop collective) albums
XXXTentacion albums
Sequel albums
Empire Distribution albums